Munich-Allach concentration camp was a forced labour camp established by the Nazi Schutzstaffel (SS) in Allach-Untermenzing, a suburb of Munich in southern Germany, in 1943. It provided slave labour for nearby factories of BMW, Dyckerhoff, Sager & Woerner, Kirsch Sägemühle, Pumpel Lochhausen and Organisation Todt with up to 17,000 prisoners in 1945. More than 1,800 of them came to death. It was the largest sub-camp of the Dachau concentration camp system (see map on the right, red square). Another smaller subcamp Allach porcelain a.k.a. Porzellan Manufaktur Allach with about 40 prisoners produced porcelain artworks.

History
A labour camp was established on February 22, 1943 to address workforce shortages in the armament and building industry of Nazi Germany.

Camp population

The camp divided Jews from non-Jews as well as men from women. The number of prisoners varied at different points in time.  Approximately 3,000–4,000 men were in the camp, with many more as Allach became an end point for many death marches and transports from other concentration camps. The women's camp was much smaller at 200–300 persons. The prisoner population in the non-Jewish camp was mainly French, Russians, Poles, Spanish, Czechs and Dutch, as well as victims of racial persecution and German opponents of the regime.

Deaths were normal, both from the cruelty of the SS and from malnutrition, inadequate sanitation and poor hygiene. As a result, dysentery, typhus, tuberculosis and scabies broke out.

Slave labor
It was the first of seven sub-camps to supply the BMW armament factory with slave laborers, where BMW 801 airplane engines were produced and repaired.
The entire subcamp, including 31 accommodation barracks, was surrounded by an electrically charged fence and guarded by watchtowers.

Liberation
US soldiers of the 42nd Rainbow Division entered the camp at around 9 am on April 30, 1945, one day after the main camp at Dachau was liberated and on the same day of Hitler's suicide. The 66th Field Hospital, attached to the 42nd Division of the US Seventh Army, was brought to Allach to take care of the sick prisoners. By May 10, they had moved on to help with the typhus epidemic in the main camp.

The fall of the Third Reich brought an end to the Allach concern. The Allach factories were shut down in 1945 and never reopened.

In the meantime, the names and origins of 1,800 dead are known; the actual number is significantly higher.

The successor company MTU Aero Engines (Dachauer Straße 665) and MAN Nutzfahrzeuge (Dachauer Straße 667) are now producing on the premises of BMW Flugmotorenbau GmbH (see map, blue).

See also
 List of German concentration camps
 List of subcamps of Dachau

References 
The United States Holocaust Memorial Museum Encyclopedia of Camps and Ghettos, 1933–1945 (Center for Advanced Holocaust Studies, United States Holocaust Memorial Museum)
March of Life

Bibliography
 

External links

 Nazi Crimes on Trial, The Dachau Trials
 Das KZ Außenlager Dachau-Allach - Daten und Fakten aka The sub-camp Dachau-Allach - facts and figures, online kz-dachau-allach.de'' (german, maps, pictures, use google translator, sub-camp Dachau-Allach ist the same as Munich-Allach). Accessed online on September 14th 2021

Subcamps of Dachau